Abaurrepea/Abaurrea Baja (Abaurrepea is the Basque name, Abaurrea Baja the Spanish; both are recognised officially) is a municipality located in the province and autonomous community of Navarre (Spanish: Navarra), northern Spain. It is situated approximately 67 km from the provincial capital, Pamplona. As of 2005 INE figures, the municipality has a population of c. 41 inhabitants.

Abaurrepea/Abaurrea Baja has an area of 11.1 km², and a median elevation above mean sea level of 855 m.

References

External links
 ABAURREAPEA/ABAURREA BAJA in the Bernardo Estornés Lasa - Auñamendi Encyclopedia (Euskomedia Fundazioa) 

Municipalities in Navarre